Deveni Gamana is a 1982 Sri Lankan film directed by H.D. Premaratne.

Cast
 Sanath Gunathilake as Saman 
 Denawaka Hamine as Unmarried old aunt 
 Sabeetha Perera as Sujatha 
 Ravindra Randeniya as Saman's brother 
 Iranganie Serasinghe as Saman's mother 
 Gamini Wijesuriya as Father
 Nilanthi Wijesinghe
 Girley Gunawardana
 Seetha Kumari
 Vincent Vaas
 Anura Medagoda
 Joe Dambulagala
 Ramani Fonseka
 Nawanandana Wijesinghe
 Felix Premawardhana
 Kanthi Fonseka

Plot
Saman is a school teacher. He marries his cousin Sujatha after a long love affair. On the wedding night, she couldn't prove her virginity. Therefore, her in laws harass her. Saman also suspects. Thus she leaves her husband's house and goes to her parents. But Saman brings her back. But Saman's mother and his unmarried old aunt make her to leave the home again. When she is leaving Saman comes and stop her.

External links
Sri Lanka Cinema Database
 

1982 films
1980s Sinhala-language films